The Commons Social Change Library is an online education library that offers resources about activism, campaigning and organising. The library is based in Australia. The founder and director of the library is Holly Hammond, an activist educator. The aim of the library is to make the work of social change and social movements more effective and efficient. It supports activists with training and resource development.  The library contains collections from Australia and around the world such as Mobilisation Lab. 

It has resources on different topics such as on arts and creativity and well-being. 

The library works on projects with organisations in Australia and around the world.

It is a registered charity and has tax Deductible Gift Recipient (DGR) status.

References

Libraries in Australia
Educational charities based in Australia